Manganese(II) sulfide is a chemical compound of manganese and sulfur. It occurs in nature as the mineral alabandite (isometric), rambergite (hexagonal), and recently found browneite (isometric, with sphalerite-type structure, extremely rare, known only from a meteorite).

Synthesis
Manganese(II) sulfide can be prepared by reacting a manganese(II) salt (such as manganese(II) chloride) with ammonium sulfide:

 +  → 2  + MnS

Properties
The crystal structure of manganese(II) sulfide is similar to that of sodium chloride.

The pink color of MnS likely results from poor coupling between the lowest energy unoccupied Mn orbitals, resulting in discrete states rather than a delocalized band. Thus the lowest energy band-to-band electronic transition requires very high energy (ultraviolet) photons.

See also
Alabandite, cubic MnS.
Manganese disulfide, MnS2, also known as Manganese(IV) Sulfide
Manganese(II) sulfate, MnSO4
Rambergite, hexagonal MnS.

References

Manganese(II) compounds
Sulfides
Rock salt crystal structure